is a lighthouse on the island of Tsunoshima in the city of Shimonoseki, Yamaguchi Prefecture, Japan. It is notable as being one of only six lighthouses in Japan which had a first order Fresnel lens, the most powerful type of Fresnel lens.

History
The lighthouse was first lit on March 1, 1876, in the Meiji period of Japan.  It was one of the lighthouses designed by Richard Henry Brunton, who was hired by the government of Japan to help construct lighthouses to make coastal waters safe for foreign ships to approach, after Japan opened up to the West.

Access
The lighthouse is open to the public.  It is accessible by car, bicycle, or public transportation; specifically by bus from Kottoi Station.

See also

 List of lighthouses in Japan

References

External links

 Tsunoshima Lighthouse Park 

Lighthouses completed in 1876
Lighthouses in Japan
Museums in Yamaguchi Prefecture
Lighthouse museums in Japan
1876 establishments in Japan
Shimonoseki